Live at the Apollo may refer to:

Albums
 Live at the Apollo (1963 album), by James Brown
 Live at the Apollo, Volume II, by James Brown, 1968
 Revolution of the Mind: Live at the Apollo, Volume III, by James Brown, 1971
 Live at the Apollo 1995, by James Brown, 1995
 Live at the Apollo (B. B. King album), 1991
 Live at the Apollo (Ben Harper and The Blind Boys of Alabama album), 2005
 Live at the Apollo (Hall & Oates album), 1985
 Live at the Apollo (Robert Palmer album), 2001
 Live at the Apollo: The Proclamation, by Byron Cage, 2007
 Live at the Apollo 2010, a video by the Stranglers, 2010

Television
 Live at the Apollo (TV series), a 2000s–2020s British stand-up comedy program

See also
 Apollo Revisited, a 2003 album by the Stranglers
 At the Apollo, a 2008 album and video by Arctic Monkeys
 Jimmy McGriff at the Apollo, a 1963 album by Jimmy McGriff
 Live at Apollo, a 2009 video by Brother Firetribe
 Showtime at the Apollo, an American variety television show